Adrian Ungur was the defending champion, but lost in the semifinals to Jaroslav Pospíšil.

Pospíšil went on to win the title, defeating Marco Cecchinato 4–6, 6–4, 6–1 in the final.

Seeds

Draw

Finals

Top half

Bottom half

References
Main Draw
Qualifying Singles

Sibiu Open - Singles
Sibiu Open
2013 in Romanian tennis